Alan Damián Bender (born 16 February 1986) is a retired Argentine-Israeli association football player who last played for Punta del Este in Uruguay.

Playing career 
Bender arrived in Israel and first trialled with Hapoel Tel Aviv. Due to his being Jewish, he was able to trial with the club since he would not count as a foreigner. Bender was passed on by Hapoel and decided to try to join other Israeli clubs.

After trialling with Ironi Nir Ramat HaSharon and playing a Toto Cup match with the club, Bender ended up signing with Hakoah Amidar/Ramat Gan. Despite impressing early in the season, Bender started to establish a poor reputation when he was fined for not taking training seriously. Just three months after joining the club, he was released by Hakoah due to his behavioral issues. After being released, he trialled at Maccabi Netanya. Then manager Lothar Matthäus was impressed by Bender, but decided not to sign him.
After 2 season's with liga Alef side Maccabi Ironi Kfar Yona, Bender was released and returned to play in Uruguay. He retired in 2014.

After retirement 
Alan started a clothing store in Buenos Aires.

Statistics

References

External links 
  

1986 births
Living people
Israeli Jews
Argentine Jews
Israeli footballers
Jewish Argentine sportspeople
Jewish Israeli sportspeople
Ferro Carril Oeste footballers
Argentine emigrants to Israel
Hakoah Maccabi Amidar Ramat Gan F.C. players
Hapoel Nir Ramat HaSharon F.C. players
Maccabi Ironi Kfar Yona F.C. players
Israeli people of Argentine-Jewish descent
Sportspeople of Argentine descent
Liga Leumit players
Footballers from Buenos Aires
Association football forwards